Logos: A Journal of Catholic Thought and Culture is a quarterly academic journal of religious studies from a Catholic perspective. The journal was established in 1997 and is published by the University of St. Thomas Center for Catholic Studies. The editor-in-chief is David P. Deavel.

Abstracting and indexing 
The journal is abstracted and indexed in:
 Academic Search Premier
 Catholic Periodical and Literature Index
 Humanities International Index
 Religious and Theological Abstracts

References

External links 
 

Catholic studies journals
Quarterly journals
English-language journals
Publications established in 1997
University of St. Thomas (Minnesota)
Academic journals published by universities and colleges of the United States
Philosophy Documentation Center academic journals